Kick Against Indiscipline, commonly known as  KAI, is an environmental law enforcement unit established in November 2003 by the Lagos State government of Nigeria to monitor and enforce environmental law in the state. The agency was established to support the overall policy of the state government in regards to its "War Against Indiscipline", an anti-indiscipline campaign created by Major General Mohammadu Buhari's military regime in 1984.

References

Government agencies and parastatals of Lagos State
Government agencies established in 2003
2003 establishments in Nigeria
Environment and heritage law enforcement agencies